V. Rasaretnam was the 23rd Surveyor General of Sri Lanka. He was appointed in 1958, succeeding N. S. Perera, and held the office until 1961. He was succeeded by J. L. T. E. Dassenaike.

References

R